The Beles Hydroelectric Power Plant, sometimes referred to as Beles II or Tana Beles, is a run-of-the-river hydroelectric power plant in Ethiopia near Lake Tana. The power plant receives water from the lake through the Tana-Beles interbasin transfer and after utilizing it to produce electricity, the water is then discharged into the Beles River. The plant has an installed capacity of 460 MW and it is the second largest power plant in the country. It was inaugurated in May 2010 and the last generator was operational in February 2012. Its construction was negatively perceived by downstream Egypt.

Background and construction
In 1992, the first feasibility study was completed for the project, a 200 MW power station. A later study and final design was completed in 2005 by Studio Pietrangeli for the current 460 MW plant. The Government of Ethiopia signed a contract with Salini Costruttori to build the plant on July 8, 2005, and construction began soon after. Because of the project's remote location, transportation and manning of personnel and equipment was difficult, often taking 4–5 months for supplies to arrive. On June 2, 2007, a tunnel boring machine (TBM), operated by SELI, began boring the  tailrace tunnel and completed it on May 31, 2008. Tunneling was carried out seven days a week in three eight-hour shifts a day. The TBM for the  headrace tunnel broke through, completing it on August 11, 2009. Salini Costruttori awarded a sub contract to construct the actual power station to VA Tech Hydro. On May 11, 2010, the first 115 MW generator at the power plant began operation and on May 14, 2010, the plant was inaugurated. The project's cost was around $500 million USD. The power plant was fully operational in February 2012.

Design
The Beles Hydroelectric Power Plant receives water from Lake Tana where it is transferred to a power station and then discharged through another tunnel and into the Beles River. This is first accomplished by an inlet on Lake Tana, where the power station can utilize  of the lake's volume for power production. At the power station, water is delivered to four Francis turbines powering four 115 MW generators. Once the water is used in hydroelectric production it is then discharged from the power station to the Beles River via a  tailrace tunnel with the same diameter as the headrace. The project is also expected to help irrigate  in the future as well.

Social and environmental impacts for the downstream communities
The Environmental Impact Assessment of the Beles Hydroelectric Power Plant is considered a formality and is unfindable.
The social impacts of the Tana-Beles water transfer have been studied and results published in the high-profile Journal of Hydrology: the dangerously high increases in discharge of Beles river have led to the drowning of 250 people between 2010 and 2018. The negative impacts on rural livelihoods are however overshadowed by national development goals (electricity production). The external costs (coping with damage) are borne by local people, who have low bargaining power.

Egyptian opposition

The Beles Hydroelectric Power Plant is part of a larger issue amongst the Nile River Basin countries as the Beles River is a tributary of the Blue Nile and Lake Tana supplies the basin as well. After the inauguration of the power plant, statements were released from a meeting of Egyptian officials, one of which was "Tana Beles dam aims to provoke Egypt’s anger and lead it to take swift diplomatic action which would turn the global opinion in favor of the upstream Nile countries." The officials, many involved in the Nile River Sector, stated they had no information about the project. The power plant was inaugurated at the same time as a Cooperative Framework Agreement over the Nile Basin was signed by upstream countries such as Uganda, Rwanda, Tanzania, and Ethiopia, but downstream countries Sudan and Egypt refused to sign. Under colonial-era accords, only Sudan and Egypt were to benefit from the Nile's flow and could reject any upstream projects that would impede it.

See also

 Energy in Ethiopia
 Water in Ethiopia
 Water politics in the Nile Basin
 List of power stations in Ethiopia

References

Hydroelectric power stations in Ethiopia
Lake Tana
Amhara Region
Run-of-the-river power stations
Dams in the Nile basin
Energy infrastructure completed in 2010
21st-century architecture in Ethiopia